Hymenodictyon orixense (syn. Hymenodictyon excelsum) is a species of flowering plant in the family Rubiaceae. It is found in the Indian Subcontinent, south-central China, Mainland Southeast Asia, and the Philippines.

References

Hymenodictyeae
Flora of the Indian subcontinent
Flora of South-Central China
Flora of Indo-China
Flora of the Philippines
Plants described in 1982